The 2017–18 Penn Quakers women's basketball team represents the University of Pennsylvania during the 2017–18 NCAA Division I women's basketball season. The Quakers, led by ninth year head coach Mike McLaughlin, play their home games at the Palestra and were members of the Ivy League. They finished the season 22–9, 11–3 to finish in second place. They advanced to the championship game of the Ivy League women's tournament where they lost to Princeton. They received an automatic trip to the Women's National Invitation Tournament where they defeated Albany in the first before losing to St. John's in the second round.

Previous season
The team was picked by the Ivy League in the pre-season to be conference champions. finished the season 22–8, 13–1 to win the Ivy League regular season title and their first ever Ivy League Tournament to earn an automatic trip to the NCAA women's tournament, which they had a 21 point lead before losing to Texas A&M in the first round.

Roster

Schedule

|-
!colspan=8 style=| Regular season

|-
!colspan=9 style=| Ivy League Women's Tournament

|-
!colspan=9 style=| WNIT

See also
 2017–18 Penn Quakers men's basketball team

References

Penn
Penn Quakers women's basketball seasons
Penn
Penn
Penn